is a Japanese actress and singer.

Biography
She was born from Tokyo. After dropping out of high school, she made her debut in 1961 in the film Yūyake Ko yake no Akatonbo (directed by Koji Shima). She went sold out as Daiei Film's fresh star. Her stage name "Mayumi Nagisa" was named by composer Kosaku Yamada.

She appeared numerously in a wide variety of genres such as teen films, yakuza films, and jidaigeki. She also worked as a singer.

In 1973, after marrying to Kuranosuke Hamaguchi with an age difference 27 years, she retired effectively and gave birth to the eldest daughter the following year.

After the death of Hamaguchi in 1990, she appeared in suspense television dramas, etc.

Currently she lives her life back and forth between her married daughter and her grandchild's home in London and Roppongi.

Filmography

Films

TV dramas

 After her return

Discography
 Singles

 Albums

Essays
National Informatics laboratory papers National Institute of Informatics

References

Japanese actresses
People from Tokyo
1944 births
Living people